Yannick Schroeder (born 10 August 1979 in Metz) is a French racing car driver.

Schroeder competed in French Formula Three in 1999 and 2000, finishing tenth and ninth in the championships in these respective years.  For 2001, he graduated to European F3000 and stayed there for 2002, placing sixth in the championship with two podium finishes.

For 2003, Schroeder graduated to International Formula 3000 with the ISR Racing team, having driven for Charouz Racing in Euro F3000.  In his maiden year, he scored 13 points and placed 12th in the championship.  By the time the 2004 season started, he had moved to Durango.  The loss of a sponsor during the season forced him to quit the championship. However, he had the consolation of coming 9th in the championship and taking a podium finish at the Nürburgring round of the series.

Racing record

Complete Euro Formula 3000 results
(key) (Races in bold indicate pole position; races in italics indicate fastest lap)

Complete International Formula 3000 results

References 

1979 births
Living people
French racing drivers
Auto GP drivers
French Formula Three Championship drivers
International Formula 3000 drivers
Sportspeople from Metz
French people of German descent
24 Hours of Spa drivers

ISR Racing drivers
Charouz Racing System drivers
Durango drivers
La Filière drivers
OAK Racing drivers